A spritz is a Venetian wine-based cocktail, commonly served as an aperitif in Northeast Italy. It consists of prosecco, digestive bitters and soda water.

The original Spritz Veneziano uses Select as bitters and was created in Venice in 1920. Popular variants are spritz al Campari which uses Campari and Aperol spritz which uses  Aperol as bitters.

Since 2011 spritz is an IBA official cocktail, initially listed as "Spritz Veneziano" then simply as "spritz".

The spritz became widely popular outside of Italy in the 2010 decade and Aperol spritz was ranked as the world's ninth bestselling cocktail in 2019 by the website Drinks International.

History
Spritz was created during the period of the Habsburg domination in Veneto in the 1800s, under the Kingdom of Lombardy–Venetia. The soldiers, but also the various merchants, diplomats and employees of the Habsburg Empire in Veneto became quickly accustomed to drinking local wine in the taverns, but they were not familiar with the wide variety of wines from the Veneto, and the alcohol content was higher than they were accustomed to. The newcomers started to ask the local hosts to spray (in German) a drop of water into the wine to make the wines lighter; the real original spritz was composed of sparkling white wine or red wine diluted with fresh water.

Between 1920s and 1930s, in Venice or in Padua, spritz was combined with local bitters (usually drunk with soda and ice). Aperol was born in Padua in 1919 and Select in Venice in 1920.

The original recipe has supposedly remained unchanged over time but it was not until the 1970s that the modern spritz recipe was set, with prosecco instead of still wine.

Over the years the drink has "grown up" with the infinite variety of possible additions, such as a sort of liquor or a bitter as the China Martini or Cynar with a lemon peel inside.

Recipe

Generally, the drink is prepared with prosecco wine, bitter liqueur such as Aperol, Campari, Cynar, or, especially in Venice, Aperitivo Select, then the glass is topped off with a dash of sparkling mineral water (more commonly club soda). It is usually served with ice in a wine or rocks glass and garnished with a slice of orange, or sometimes an olive, depending on the liqueur.

Original venetian spritz includes:
 7.5 cl prosecco;
 5 cl Select;
 2.5 cl soda water;
 one green olive.
Spritz includes:
 1/3 sparkling white wine (usually prosecco)
 1/3 bitters (Select, Aperol or Campari);
 1/3 sparkling or soda water.
IBA's official recipe includes:
 9 cl prosecco;
 6 cl Aperol (there are other versions of the Spritz that use Campari, Cynar or Select);
 Splash of soda water.

There is no single composition for a spritz, and it is prepared with different ingredients in different towns and cities, meaning that the alcohol content is highly variable. However, a common denominator is the presence of sparkling white wine and water, with the remaining being made up from a great variety of alcoholic drinks, sometimes mixed, but with an unwritten rule to preserve the red/orange color of the cocktail. Finally, a slice of lemon, orange or an olive and a few ice cubes are added.

Variations
 Spritz Bianco (White Spritz)  made by white still wine and sparkling water, as the ancient Spritzer, is mostly used in Friuli Venezia Giulia
 Istrian Aperol Spritz  uses teranino (a liqueur made from Teran wine from Istria, Croatia) instead of prosecco
 Italicus Spritz  uses Italicus, a Bergamot orange-based liqueur

See also
 Hugo (cocktail)
 Negroni sbagliato
 Pirlo (aperitivo)
 List of cocktails
 Spritzer

References

Cuisine of Veneto
Cocktails with Prosecco
Cocktails with bitters
Italian alcoholic drinks
Cocktails with Aperol